No. 11 or XI Squadron (sometimes featuring an 'F' to represent its historic fighter role (No. 11(F) or XI(F) Squadron)), is "the world's oldest, dedicated fighter unit" and continues the traditions established by the similarly numbered Royal Flying Corps squadron, established in 1915. After a history of equipment with numerous different aircraft types, the squadron most recently operated the Tornado F3 until 2005 when it was disbanded. It was reactivated in 2006 to operate the Typhoon F2, receiving its first aircraft (serial number ZJ931) on 9 October 2006.

History

World War I
It was the first squadron solely equipped with fighters to deploy with the RFC, or with any flying service.

The squadron's Gunbusses were soon pressed into service, with Captain Lionel Rees claiming the squadron's first air-to-air victory on 28 July, forcing down a German observation aircraft. Second Lieutenant G. S. M. Insall was awarded a Victoria Cross for an action on 7 November 1915 in which he forced down and destroyed a German Aviatik observation aircraft. The Gunbus was already obsolete however, and was initially supplemented by a mixture of Bristol Scouts and Nieuport 16s until replaced by the Royal Aircraft Factory F.E.2b of similar layout, but slightly higher performance, in June 1916. These in turn were replaced by Bristol Fighters in August 1917, these being used both for offensive patrols over German-held territory and for ground attack for the remainder of the war. The Squadron was disbanded at the end of 1919.

No. 11 Squadron numbered 19 flying aces in its ranks during the war. Among them were Victoria Cross winner Lionel Rees, as well as Andrew Edward McKeever, John Stanley Chick, Eugene Coler, Albert Ball VC, Frederick Libby, Ronald Maudit, John Quested, Herbert Sellars, Donald Beard, Stephen Price and Hugh Hay Thomas Frederick Stephenson.

The twin Eagles on the Squadron's crest, awarded in May 1937, represent the two-seated fighters operated in the First World War.

Between the Wars
The Squadron reformed at RAF Andover in January 1923 as a day bomber squadron equipped with Airco DH.9As, soon moving to RAF Bircham Newton in Norfolk.  In April 1924, these were replaced by the Fairey Fawn despite the fact that they offered little improvement in performance over the DH.9A, moving with them to RAF Netheravon in May that year. The unpopular Fawns were replaced by Hawker Horsleys in November 1926, in use until December 1928, when the squadron handed the Horsleys to 100 Squadron and was posted to Risalpur in India (now in Pakistan), flying Westland Wapitis in Army co-operation and carrying out punitive air raids against rebelling tribal forces. It replaced its Wapitis with Hawker Harts in February 1932, operations continuing as before. On 31 May 1935, an earthquake devastated the city of Quetta and the surrounding area. No. 11 Squadron, along with other RAF squadrons in the region, were used to aid the relief effort following the disaster. The squadron received Blenheim I monoplane bombers in July 1939, moving to Singapore the next month, just before the outbreak of World War II in Europe.

World War II

In April 1940 the squadron moved to India, and was briefly based at Karachi before it was ordered to transfer to Aden due to the increasing likelihood of war with Italy. The first of the squadron's Blenheims reached Aden on 19 June 1940, nine days after Italy declared war on Britain, and flew its first combat mission of the war on 19 June. The squadron was heavily engaged in the early months of the Eastern Africa campaign, attacking Italian targets in Italian East Africa. In December 1940, the squadron was ordered to move to Egypt to support the upcoming British offensive in the Western Desert, Operation Compass, with the squadron being based at Helwan, near Cairo, with a forward detachment at Fuka to support the offensive.

In January 1941 the squadron was ordered to reinforce the Royal Air Force squadrons in Greece, fighting in the Greek Campaign against the Italians, partly re-equipping with newer Blenheim IVs from 39 Squadron before leaving for Greece, arriving at Larissa on 28 January. On the night of 28 February/1 March 1941, Larissa was hit by a powerful earthquake, badly damaging both the airfield and the town. Personnel of the Larissa-based squadrons spent the rest of the night rescuing people trapped in collapsed buildings. In March, 11 Squadron joined the newly-established 'E' (Eastern) Wing for operations over Thessaliniki. On 6 April 1941, Germany launched an invasion of Yugoslavia and Greece. 11 Squadron's Blenheims were employed on attacks on columns of German troops in Yugoslavia, but by 16 April, the squadron was ordered to withdraw from Almyros to Acharnes to avoid the German advance. The few surviving aircraft and crews were evacuated to Crete and then to Egypt. and from there on to Aqir, Palestine where the squadron rebuilt its strength, becoming operational again on 28 May 1941. 

After reforming, the squadron served in the Syrian Campaign against the Vichy French, attacking airfields by day and night. In August that year the squadron moved to Habbaniya in Iraq, and on 26 August, took part in the Anglo-Soviet operation to secure the Persian oilfields for the Allies, although it only dropped leaflets. After returning to Egypt the squadron took part in Operation Crusader.

Redeployed to Colombo, Ceylon in early 1942, the squadron was involved in attacks on Japanese shipping. During 1943, the Squadron re-equipped with Hurricanes and moved to Burma in the ground attack role, supporting the Fourteenth Army.

By January 1943, Royal Australian Air Force (RAAF) personnel, or Australians serving in the RAF, made up almost 90% of the aircrews in the squadron (even though it was not officially an RAAF "Article XV squadron"). At the time, the Australian personnel included the commanding officer, Wing Commander Harley Stumm.

11 Squadron was one of the few RAF squadrons to fight against Italian, German, Vichy French and Japanese forces.

Since 1945

The Squadron formed part of the occupation forces in Japan from August 1945 to February 1948, when it disbanded. Reforming in Germany during October 1949, they flew Mosquitos, Vampires and Venoms. The Squadron again disbanded in 1957, but reformed in January 1959 with Meteor night fighters. Javelins replaced the Meteors one year later and the Squadron was based at RAF Geilenkirchen, in West Germany, equipped with this type until another disbandment in 1966.

Reforming in early 1967, No. 11 Squadron spent the next 21 years flying Lightnings, until May 1988. By that time it was one of the last two squadrons equipped with this aircraft and was based at RAF Binbrook in Lincolnshire.

From August 1988 the squadron operated the twin seat Panavia Tornado F3 from RAF Leeming. In February 2003 it was announced that some of No. 11 Squadron's Tornado F3s had been modified to carry the ALARM missile (and unofficially designated as Tornado EF3s) to widen their capabilities to include suppression of enemy air defences (SEAD). Following the publication of the Future Capabilities study on 21 July 2004, XI(F) squadron disbanded in October 2005.

The RAF announced that 11 Squadron would be the second front line squadron to re-equip with the Typhoon but would now be based at RAF Coningsby. The Squadron stood up at Coningsby on 29 March 2007, dropping the (F) designation in recognition of its new tasking as the Royal Air Force's lead Typhoon multi-role squadron. In March 2011, 11 Squadron (assisted by some 29(R) Squadron personnel and additional aircraft supplied by 29(R) and 3(F) Squadrons) deployed to Gioia Del Colle, Bari, Italy, to help police the no-fly zone imposed by Resolution 1973 over Libya as part of Operation Ellamy.

In 2013 the squadron deployed to the Mediterranean again, this time RAF Akrotiri in Cyprus, as part of 121 EAW providing air defence of Cyprus under the auspices of Operation Luminous.

XI(F) Squadron resumed the use of its '(F)' Fighter status during its centenary year, with celebrations taking place on 7 and 8 May 2015 in the form of a formal dinner with the Squadron Association, and a parade complete with flypast.

During February 2018, the squadron participated in Exercise Red Flag 18-1, the world's largest and most complex air combat exercise run by the US Air Force. For the duration of the exercise the squadron's Typhoons operated from Nellis Air Force Base in Nevada.

Aircraft operated 
List of aircraft operated by No. 11 Squadron:

 Vickers E.S.1 (1915–1915)
 Vickers FB.5/FB.9 (1915–1916)
 Bristol Scout (1915–1916)
 Nieuport 16/17 (1915–1916)
 Royal Aircraft Factory F.E.2b (1916–1917)
 Bristol F.2b (1917–1919)
 Airco DH.9A (1923–1924)
 Fairey Fawn (1924–1926)
 Hawker Horsley (1926–1928)
 Westland Wapiti (1928–1932)
 Hawker Hart (1932–1939)
 Bristol Blenheim Mk I/Mk IV (1939–1943)
 Hawker Hurricane Mk II (1943–1945)
 Supermarine Spitfire Mk XIV/Mk XVIII (1945–1948)
 de Havilland Mosquito FB.VI (1948–1950)
 de Havilland Vampire FB.5 (1950–1952)
 de Havilland Venom FB.1/FB.4 (1952–1957)
 Gloster Meteor NF.11 (1959–1962)
 Gloster Javelin FAW.4/FAW.5/FAW.9 (1959–1966)
 English Electric Lightning F.3/F.6 (1967–1988)
 Panavia Tornado F3 (1988–2005)
 Eurofighter Typhoon (2007 – present)

See also
List of Royal Air Force aircraft squadrons

References

Citations

Bibliography
 
 
 
 
 
 
 
 
 
 
 
 
 
 
 
 Warner, Graham. The Bristol Blenheim: A complete history 2nd Edition. Crecy Publishing, 2005. .

External links

 No. 11 Squadron on RAF website
XI Squadron Association

Military units and formations established in 1915
011 Squadron
011 Squadron
1915 establishments in the United Kingdom
Military units and formations in Mandatory Palestine in World War II
R
British Commonwealth Occupation Force